Irene Diamond (May 7, 1910 – January 21, 2003) was a Hollywood talent scout and later in life a philanthropist.

Early life
Irene Diamond was born Irene Levine on May 7, 1910, to Jewish immigrant parents.

Career
Diamond was an assistant editor for Warner Brothers in their story division. During a 25-year collaboration with producer Hal B. Wallis, she made recommendations on many scripts, including The Maltese Falcon and Dark Victory. In 1941 on a visit to New York City she read an unproduced play titled Everybody Comes to Rick's, by Murray Burnett and Joan Alison. After she persuaded Wallis to purchase the script for $20,000, he retitled it and produced the film Casablanca.

Philanthropy
Diamond was co-chair of the Aaron Diamond Foundation with her husband from the 1950s onwards. Following his sudden death in 1985, Diamond became the sole president of the foundation. They established the Aaron Diamond AIDS Research Center in 1991.

Diamond founded the Irene Diamond Fund in 1994. The fund endowed AIDS research.

In 2000, Diamond founded the New York Choreographic Institute alongside Peter Martins.

In 1999, then U.S. President Bill Clinton presented her with the National Medal of Arts award. She was elected a fellow of the American Academy of Arts and Sciences in 2001.

Personal life
She was married to real estate developer Aaron Diamond from 1942 until his death in 1985. They resided on the Upper East Side of Manhattan in New York City, and had one daughter, Jean.

Death
Diamond died on January 21, 2003, in New York City.

See also
Aaron Diamond AIDS Research Center

References

https://web.archive.org/web/20060929120906/http://www.foundationnews.org/CME/article.cfm?ID=1454
https://web.archive.org/web/20061004085231/http://www.adarc.org/news/Irene%20Diamond/LA%20times.html
https://web.archive.org/web/20061004091308/http://www.adarc.org/about/history-irenediamond.htm

1910 births
2003 deaths
People from the Upper East Side
Jewish American philanthropists
Philanthropists from New York (state)
Fellows of the American Academy of Arts and Sciences
20th-century American philanthropists
20th-century American Jews
21st-century American Jews